Marshall Field (1834–1906) was the founder of Marshall Field's.

Marshall Field may also refer to:

Marshall Field III (1893–1956), publisher, founder of the Chicago Sun newspaper
Marshall Field IV (1916–1965), owner of the Chicago Sun-Times 

Stagg Field, American football stadium at the University of Chicago opened in 1893 as Marshall Field, renamed in 1913, and demolished in 1957
 Marshall Army Airfield Named Marshall Field from 1923 until 1948.

See also
Marshall Field's department store
Field Marshall, a brand of tractor
Field marshal, the most senior military rank in many armies